Vyacheslav Panteleyevich Zherebkin (born August 30, 1968 in Domodedovo, Moscow oblast, USSR) is a Russian singer who rose to popularity as member of the Russian band Na Na. Honored Artist of Russia (2001).

Career 
1992 – present – Performer in Russian band Na Na.
2000 – Signed a contract with Dick Clark Productions.

References

External links 

 

1968 births
21st-century Russian male singers
21st-century Russian singers
Living people
Musicians from Moscow
Honored Artists of the Russian Federation
Russian bass guitarists
Male bass guitarists
20th-century Russian male singers
20th-century Russian singers